Simon Bailey may refer to:

 Simon Bailey (priest) (1955–1995), Anglican priest and writer
 Simon Bailey (archivist), Keeper of the Archives at the University of Oxford in England
 Simon T. Bailey (born 1968), American speaker, author, life coach and entrepreneur
 Simon Bailey (police officer), Chief Constable of the Norfolk Constabulary
 Simon Bailey (runner) (born 1980), English fell runner
Simon Bailly, English politician